The Theban Tomb TT61 is located in Sheikh Abd el-Qurna. It forms part of the Theban Necropolis, situated on the west bank of the Nile opposite to Luxor.

The tomb belongs to an 18th Dynasty ancient Egyptian named Useramen, who was a Vizier during the reigns of Hatshepsut and Thutmosis III.

See also 
 List of Theban tombs

References

Buildings and structures completed in the 13th century BC
Theban tombs